The Guard is a 2001 Indian Malayalam-language film directed and written by debutante Hakim Rawther. It was jointly produced by Sabitha Jayaraj (Green Dragon Movies) and Kerala State Film Development Corporation (KSFDC). The film has Kalabhavan Mani, the only actor on screen, playing the role of a forest guard in an isolated dense forest.

Yaadein (Hindi, 1964), which featured two actors, previously held the Guinness World Records in the category Fewest actors in a narrative film. The crew of The Guard  made an attempt to replace the former record but failed. The film features cinematography by Saloo George, editing by Venugopal and artwork by Nathan Mannoor. The background score has been provided by Biju and songs featured in the film are composed by Shyam Sharman and Rajesh with lyrics written by Arumughan Vengidang. All the songs are sung by Kalabhavan Mani himself. An experimental film in all aspects, it released to critical acclaim and did a moderate business at the box office.

Plot

The story in a nutshell is how a poor man, Appukuttan Nair (Kalabhavan Mani) gets a job as a forest guard. His first appointment is in a lonely, isolated dense forest. His predecessor there was one Thomachan, who was supposedly trampled to death by a tusker. Anyhow, Appukuttan takes charge and in the dense forest he is left all alone, save the innumerable animals and birds around him and the frightening sounds of the jungle. But life in the jungle teaches him many things about men and human society and he gets a new perspective to look at things.

Cast
 Kalabhavan Mani as Appukkuttan Nair

Soundtrack
The film features 7 songs composed by Shyam Dharman and Rajesh with lyrics penned by Arumughan Vengidang. All the songs are based on folk music and are sung by Kalabhavan Mani himself.

References

External links
 
 
 

2000s Malayalam-language films
One-character films